Edward Frank Mierkowicz (March 6, 1924 – May 19, 2017), nicknamed "Butch" and "Mouse," was an American professional baseball player. He played in Major League Baseball from 1945 to 1950 as an outfielder for the Detroit Tigers and St. Louis Cardinals. Mierkowicz was a member of the world champion 1945 Detroit Tigers team.

Early life
Born in Wyandotte, Michigan, Mierkowicz was the son of a factory worker who made gaskets. He lettered in three sports at Roosevelt High School in Wyandotte and caught the eye of legendary Detroit scout, Wish Egan, during a high school baseball game. But upon graduating from high school, Mierkowicz was called up by the Army in 1942. Mierkowicz was discharged after contracting rheumatic fever and was signed by Egan and the Detroit Tigers. Mierkowicz played in Hagerstown, Maryland in 1944 and in Buffalo in 1945.

Major league career
At the end of the 1945 season, with the Tigers in a pennant race, Mierkowicz was called up. He played in 10 games in his rookie season, batting .133 for a Tigers team that won the 1945 World Series. Mierkowicz stayed with the team for the World Series and was put in as a defensive replacement for Hank Greenberg in the 9th inning of Game 7. Mierkowicz did not bat in the Series but he received a World Series ring in his rookie season. In 1946, Mierkowicz spent most of the season in the minor leagues with Buffalo, but he did play in 21 games with the Tigers, batting .190. In 1948, he appeared in 3 games. He finished his major career on April 19, 1950, with the St. Louis Cardinals. He struck out in his one and only at bat for the Cardinals. Mierkowicz continued to play professional baseball until 1957, including stints in Cuba, Mexico, and the Sacramento Solons of the Pacific Coast League in 1955. After his baseball career ended, Mierkowicz worked for 24 years at a waste treatment plant in Wyandotte, Michigan. He retired in 1984.

He said his Major League career "was like a cup of coffee but no cream" but added that "God gave me the ability to play ball.  Made a pretty good living.  We didn't make a lot of money, but it was a lot of fun."

Later life
With the death of Virgil Trucks in 2013, Mierkowicz became the last living Tiger to play in the 1945 World Series and the last player to have played against the Cubs in a World Series until 2016. There are no living players who played in an earlier World Series for the winning team. Mierkowicz died on May 19, 2017.

References

Sources

 Richard Bak, "Cobb Would Have Caught It: The Golden Age of Baseball in Detroit" (Wayne State Univ. Press 1991), Chapter 18 ("Ed Mierkowicz")
 Patrick M. O'Connell, A Tiger's tale: Sole survivor of Cubs' last Series, 71 years ago, Chicago Tribune, February 23, 2016

1924 births
2017 deaths
People from Wyandotte, Michigan
Military personnel from Michigan
Baseball players from Michigan
Buffalo Bisons (minor league) players
Columbus Jets players
Detroit Tigers players
Hagerstown Owls players
Houston Buffaloes players
Little Rock Travelers players
Major League Baseball outfielders
Miami Marlins (IL) players
Milwaukee Brewers (minor league) players
Richmond Virginians (minor league) players
Rochester Red Wings players
Sacramento Solons players
St. Louis Cardinals players
San Antonio Missions players
Seattle Rainiers players
Syracuse Chiefs players
Tecolotes de Nuevo Laredo players
United States Army personnel of World War II
American expatriate baseball players in Mexico